The Mixed team sprint track cycling event at the 2012 Summer Paralympics took place on 2 September at London Velopark. The event was contested riders in classes C1-5. Ten national teams competed. The teams with the best two qualifying times raced off for gold and silver, third and fourth for bronze.

Qualification
Q=Qualified for final round. WR=World record.

Finals
Gold medal match

Bronze medal match

References

X Mixed team sprint